Sciography, also spelled sciagraphy or skiagraphy, is a branch of the science of perspective dealing with the projection of shadows, or the delineation of an object in perspective with its gradations of light and shade.

In architectural drawing, sciography is the study of shades and shadows cast by simple architectural forms on plane surfaces.

In general sciography, the light source is imagined as the sun inclined at 45 degrees to both vertical plane and horizontal plane coming from left hand side. The resultant shadow is then drawn.

References

Bibliography 
 

Technical drawing
Architecture